Ashay Palkar (born 1 September 1989) is an Indian cricketer. He made his List A debut for Maharashtra in the 2018–19 Vijay Hazare Trophy on 23 September 2018. He made his first-class debut for Maharashtra in the 2018–19 Ranji Trophy on 12 November 2018. He made his Twenty20 debut on 4 November 2021, for Maharashtra in the 2021–22 Syed Mushtaq Ali Trophy.

References

External links
 

1989 births
Living people
Indian cricketers
Maharashtra cricketers
Place of birth missing (living people)